Trapania fusca is a species of sea slug, a dorid nudibranch, a marine gastropod mollusc in the family Goniodorididae.

Distribution
This species was described from the Bay of Arcachon, France where it was found commonly beneath oyster trestles. It has also been reported from the Mediterranean Sea.

Description
This goniodorid nudibranch is translucent white with a pattern of brown spots forming regular patches on the body. The head, rhinophore lamellae and lateral papillae are mostly opaque white. There are yellow markings on the rhinophores and the oral tentacles and tail are yellow with a white tip.

Ecology
Trapania fusca probably feeds on Entoprocta, which often grow on sponges and other living substrata.

References

Goniodorididae
Gastropods described in 1874